Carl Fredrik Fallén (born 22 September 1764 in Kristinehamn – 26 August 1830) was a Swedish botanist and entomologist.

Fallén taught at the Lund University. He wrote Diptera Sueciae (1814–27).

Fallén described very many species of Diptera and Hymenoptera

He was elected a member of the Royal Swedish Academy of Sciences in 1810.

Publications
May be incomplete

Monographia cimicum Sveciae. Hafniae [= Copenhagen]. 124 p. (1807)
Specimen entomologicum novam Diptera disponendi methodum exhibens. Berlingianus, Lundae [= Lund]. 26 p. (1810)
Försök att bestämma de i Sverige funne Flugarter, som kunna föras till Slägtet Tachina. K. Sven. Vetenskapsakad. Handl. (2) 31: 253–87. (1810)
Specimen Novam Hymenoptera Disponendi Methodum Exhibens. Dissertation. Berling, Lund. pp. 1–41. 1 pl.(1813).
Beskrifning öfver några i Sverige funna Vattenflugor (Hydromyzides). K. Sven. Vetenskapsakad. Handl. (3) 1: 240–57. (1813)
1814. Specimen novam Hemiptera disponendi methodum.  Publicae disquistioni subjicit Magnus Rodhe Lundae. Litteris Berlingianus: 1–26. (1814)
Beskrifning öfver några Rot-fluge Arter, hörande till slägterna Thereva och Ocyptera. K. Sven. Vetenskapsakad. Handl. (3) 3: 229–40. (1815)
Syrphici Sveciae [part]. Berling, Lundae [= Lund]. P. 23-62 (1817)
Scenopinii et Conopsariae Sveciae. Berling, Lundae [= Lund]. 14 p. (1817)
Beskrifning öfver de i Sverige funna Fluge Arter, som kunna föras till Slägtet Musca. Första Afdelningen. K. Sven. Vetenskapsakad. Handl. (3) 4: 226–54.(1817)
Heteromyzides Sveciae. Berling, Lundae [= Lund]. 10 p. (1820)
Opomyzides Sveciae. Berling, Lundae [= Lund]. 12 p. (1820)
Ortalides Sveciae. Part. III: a et ultima. Berling, Lundae [= Lund]. P. 25–34. (1820)
Sciomyzides Sveciae. Berling, Lundae [= Lund]. 16 p. (1820)
Monographia Muscidum Sveciae. Part. V. Berling, Lundae [= Lund]. P. 49–56. (1823)
Agromyzides Sveciae. Berling, Lundae [= Lund]. 10 p. (1823)
Hydromyzides Sveciae. Berling, Lundae [=Lund]. 12 p. (1823)
Geomyzides Sveciae. Berling, Lundae [= Lund]. 8 p. (1823)
Monographia Dolichopodum Sveciae. Berling, Lundae [= Lund]. 24 p. (1823)
Phytomyzides et Ochtidiae Sveciae. Berling, Lundae [= Lund]. 10 p. (1823)
Monographia Muscidum Sveciae. Part IX & ultima. Berling, Lundae [= Lund]. P. 81–94. (18 June) (1825)
Hemiptera Svesiae. Cimicides eorumquea familiae affines.  Londini Gothorum. Ex Officina Berlingiana: 1–187. (1829)

References

External links
EOL Encyclopedia of Life Taxa described by Carl Fredrik Fallén. Type Fallen into the search box.
Works by Carl Fredrik Fallén at the Biodiversity Heritage Library
Svenskt biografiskt lexikon biography and portrait 

Swedish zoologists
Swedish entomologists
Dipterists
Members of the Royal Swedish Academy of Sciences
1764 births
1830 deaths
People from Kristinehamn
People from Kristinehamn Municipality